Nathalie Serre (born 17 August 1968) is a French politician who has been Member of Parliament for Rhône's 8th constituency since 2020, when she replaced Patrice Verchère.

References 

Living people
1968 births
Politicians from Besançon
The Republicans (France) politicians

Women members of the National Assembly (France)
21st-century French women politicians
21st-century French politicians
Deputies of the 15th National Assembly of the French Fifth Republic